Nazuiyeh (also Romanized as Nāzū’īyeh; also known as Nārzū’īyeh) is a village in Khabar Rural District, Dehaj District, Shahr-e Babak County, Kerman Province, Iran. At the 2006 census, its population was 40, in 10 families.

References 

Populated places in Shahr-e Babak County